Scopula ferruginea is a moth of the family Geometridae. It was described by George Hampson in 1893. It is endemic to Sri Lanka.

Description
It is a white moth with black frons. Thorax and abdomen suffused with rusty color. Wings irrorated (sprinkled) with a few black scales. Forewings suffused with a rusty color, which is bright on the medial and basal inner areas. There is an indistinct antemedial line angled below the costa. A black cell-speck. A diffused fuscous postmedial line angled below the costa, then oblique. There is an indistinct rufous submarginal line highly angled at vein 6, and with a black spot at the angle. A sinuous white submarginal line present. Hindwings with antemedial blackish line. Cell-speck present. Sinuous postmedial rufous line, with a rufous bands beyond it, and a submarginal line.

References

Moths described in 1893
ferruginea
Endemic fauna of Sri Lanka
Moths of Sri Lanka
Taxa named by George Hampson